The BOP clade (sometimes BEP clade) is one of two major lineages (or clades) of undefined taxonomic rank in the grasses (Poaceae), containing more than 5,400 species, about half of all grasses. Its sister group is the PACMAD clade; contrary to many species of that group who have evolved C4 photosynthesis, the BOP grasses all use the C3 photosynthetic pathway.

The clade contains three subfamilies from whose initials its name derives: the bamboos (Bambusoideae); Oryzoideae (syn. Ehrhartoideae), including rice; and Pooideae, mainly distributed in temperate regions, with the largest diversity and important cereal crops such as wheat and barley. Oryzoideae is the earliest-diverging lineage, sister to the bamboos and Pooideae:

References 

Poaceae
Photosynthesis
Plant unranked clades